Marko Ivezić (born 2 December 2001) is a Serbian football defensive midfielder who plays for Voždovac.

International career
Ivezić made his debut for Serbia national football team on 25 January 2023 in a friendly match against USA. Serbia won the game 2 – 1, with Ivezić coming on in the second half as a substitute.

Career statistics

International

References

External links
 
 
 
 

2001 births
Living people
Association football midfielders
Serbian footballers
Serbian SuperLiga players
FK Voždovac players
Serbia under-21 international footballers
Serbia international footballers